State High School is a public secondary school located at Ibereko, Badagry, Lagos State.

References

Schools in Lagos